
The Brunswick #6 mine is a copper-lead-zinc mine in the Bathurst Mining Camp of northern New Brunswick, Canada. It was discovered in October, 1952 and was in production from 1966 until 1983. The Brunswick #6 orebody was the first major sulfide deposit discovered in the Bathurst area. The mine operated as an open-pit operation until 1977 when a ramp was driven from the bottom of the pit to access deeper ore.

Geology

The Brunswick #6 deposit is a volcanogenic massive sulfide (VMS) deposit rich in lead, zinc, and copper.

References

External links

Mines in New Brunswick
Surface mines in Canada
Underground mines in Canada
Copper mines in Canada
Zinc mines in Canada
Lead mines in Canada
Volcanogenic massive sulfide ore deposits